The  Madeira Natural Park is a large biological reserve in Madeira with a unique endemic flora and fauna.  It was created in 1982 to safeguard the natural heritage of the archipelago, and contains a number of endangered species including global rarities such as Zino's petrel. This nature park encompasses nearly two-thirds of the territory of the island of Madeira, and within it are nature reserves, protected landscapes and leisure zones. Its key habitat is the laurel forest.

References

External links
 
UNESCO laurisilva  page
Parque Natural da Madeira 

National parks of Autonomous Region of Madeira
Nature parks in Portugal
1982 establishments in Portugal